The  was a public junior college in Ikuno-ku, Osaka, Japan.

History 
 1949: The school's predecessor was founded.
 1950: The junior college for mechanical engineering and electrical engineering was founded.
 1951: The third academic department was set up.
 1964: Daytime courses at Neyagawa were discontinued.
 1967: The Campus moved from Asahi-ku to Ikuno-ku.
 1983: The University ceased operations.

Academic departments
 Mechanical engineering
 Electrical engineering
 Welding

See also 
 Osaka Prefecture University
 Junior College of Agriculture, University of Osaka Prefecture

References

External links
  

Japanese junior colleges
Educational institutions established in 1950
Public universities in Japan
Universities and colleges in Osaka Prefecture
Junior Colledge
Educational institutions disestablished in 1983
1950 establishments in Japan